Karin Hänel (after marriage Antretter; born 28 May 1957) is a retired long jumper from Germany. She won two medals at the European Indoor Championships.

Achievements

External links
 European Indoor Championships

1957 births
Living people
West German female long jumpers